Conacmella is a genus of minute, salt marsh snails with an operculum, aquatic gastropod mollusks, or micromollusks, in the family Assimineidae.

Species
Species in the genus Conacmella include:
 Conacmella vagans

References

Assimineidae
Taxonomy articles created by Polbot